Olivio Sòzzi or Sozzi (1696 in Palermo – 1765 in Spaccaforno) was an Italian painter, active in Sicily during the Rococo period.

Biography
He obtained his first training in the local studio of Filippo Tancredi, he then moved in 1729 along with Gaspare Serenario to Rome to work with Sebastiano Conca. He befriended Corrado Giaquinto.  He returned to Palermo in 1740, and moved to Catania in 1750. He was very prolific in Sicily, painting sacred subjects in oil and fresco in numerous churches and monasteries.

In his later years, he worked in the southwest of the island, decorating the church of San Sebastiano, Melilli (1752), and the Basilica of Santa Maria Maggiore in Ispica (or Spaccaforno) (1763), near Ragusa. He died from a risk faced by fresco painters of ceilings, falling from a scaffold built to decorate a chapel ceiling in the Basilica at Ispica.

Among his pupils was Sebastiano Lo Monaco. Sozzi's daughter married the painter Vito D'Anna of Palermo; the latter was helping him in his last work at Ispica. His works can be found in Agrigento, Catania, Messina, Siracusa, Trapani, Palermo, and Ragusa.

References

18th-century Italian painters
Italian male painters
Italian Baroque painters
1696 births
1765 deaths
Painters from Palermo
18th-century Italian male artists